Jiqingmendajie station, is a station of Line 2 of the Nanjing Metro. It started operations on 28 May 2010 along with the rest of Line 2. The theme of this station's decoration is Mid-Autumn Festival.

Station structure
When approaching or leaving the station, trains have to move slower due to the adjusting and switching of the rail.

References

Railway stations in Jiangsu
Railway stations in China opened in 2010
Nanjing Metro stations